The 2017–18 season is Bolton Wanderers's first season back in the second tier of English football following their immediate return from EFL League One. The season covered the period from 1 July 2017 to 30 June 2018.

Pre-season
On 9 May 2017 the club announced that they would host Stoke City on 29 July, a week before their league campaign commences. Two days later, Reece Wabara, Liam Trotter, Lewis Buxton, Tom Walker and Will Jääskeläinen were all confirmed to be leaving the club at the end of their contracts on 30 June, with Conor Wilkinson being allowed to speak to other clubs. The next week five of the club's young players, including Alex Samizadeh and Jack Earing who had previously played for the first team, were offered third year scholarships. On 19 May, a second pre season friendly was announced against National League North side Stockport County on 25 July. Later the same day they confirmed that Lawrie Wilson, Dean Moxey and Mark Davies would also be leaving the club at the end of their contracts. On 24 May, the club confirmed that Jem Karacan had signed a one-year deal, with an option for a further year, keeping him at the club until at least June 2018. A day later Andrew Taylor, who had spent the previous season on loan at the club, joined on a permanent basis on a free transfer from Wigan Athletic on a two-year deal.

26 May saw the club announce more pre-season fixtures. They would travel to Chorley on 8 July and then Fleetwood Town on 22 July. Meanwhile, a Bolton XI would play West Didsbury & Chorlton, Atherton Collieries, F.C. United of Manchester and Marine. The game against West Didsbury & Chorlton was later postponed to a later date. Four days later a fifth match, this one at AFC Fylde, was added to the pre-season diary. Early the next morning the club confirmed that Gary Madine had signed a new two-year contract, keeping him at the club until 2019.

On the first day of June the club announced that David Wheater had signed a new one-year contract with the option of an extension. Five days later, Adam Le Fondre was also signed up, this time on a two-year contract with the option of an extension. Dorian Dervite was the next to sign a new contract, agreeing a new one-year deal, with the option of an extension, on 9 June. A two-year shirt sponsorship deal with the bookmaker Betfred was announced on 12 June. The EFL retained and released list from 13 June confirmed that further players, including George Newell, had been released. Mark Little became the first new player to join the club when it was announced that he was joining from Bristol City on 16 June. On 20 June, Filipe Morais signed a one-year extension to his contract, keeping him at the club until June 2018. A further friendly, this time at Scottish League One side Arbroath on 11 July, was confirmed on 21 June. Max Clayton became the first player to join a new club when it was confirmed on 22 June that he would be joining Blackpool at the expiration of his current contract. On 27 June, the same day that the squad returned to training, a second friendly in Scotland was announced, this time at Dundee on 14 July. 29 June saw forward Conor Wilkinson join Gillingham on a free transfer.

On 3 July, the same day that the club confirmed that Jake Turner, Conor Hall and Jeff King had signed new contracts, Jamie Proctor left the club for Rotherham United for an undisclosed fee. Former Bradford City player Stephen Darby joined his former manager on 7 July on a free transfer. A day later the club confirmed that former captain Jay Spearing had left the club after failing to agree a new contract.

Pre-season kicked off on 8 July with Bolton meeting Chorley for the Howard Taylor Memorial Trophy. With two separate teams starting both halves, the first half team fell behind to two quick goals but the second half team rallied, with two goals from Harry Brockbank and a Ryan White effort sealing the win. Three days later the club commenced their two-game Scottish tour with a 2–1 win at Arbroath, Adam Le Fondre and Connor Hall scoring either side of an Arbroath penalty. They followed this with the same result at Dundee, Gary Madine and Josh Vela giving them a two-goal cushion in the first half. This was on the same day that Sammy Ameobi signed for the club on a permanent basis following his loan the previous season after his release by Newcastle United and Alex Samizadeh leaving to join Kilmarnock. Bolton secured their first loan signing of the season on 17 July when Adam Armstrong joined from Newcastle United until January.

Competitions

EFL Championship

League table

Result summary

Results by matchday

Matches
On 21 June 2017 the fixtures for the forthcoming season were announced. Bolton started the season at home to Leeds United on 6 August and will finish at home to Nottingham Forest on 6 May 2018.

FA Cup

Bolton will enter the competition at the third round stage alongside all other EFL Championship and Premier League sides. They were drawn at home to Premier League side Huddersfield Town in the third round.

EFL Cup

Bolton entered the competition at the first round stage and were drawn to play away at Crewe Alexandra in the first round. Falling behind in the first half, both Adam Armstrong and Derik scored their first goals for the club in the second half to send Bolton through to the second round where they were drawn at home against Sheffield Wednesday. Bolton raced to a 3–0 lead over their visitors with goals from Jem Karacan, Dorian Dervite and an Adam Armstrong penalty. Despite Jordan Rhodes scoring late twice for the visitors, and both managers being sent to the stands late in the game, Bolton progressed to the third round for the first time in three years, where they were drawn away at Premier League West Ham United.

Squad

Statistics

|-
|colspan=14|Player(s) who left the club:

|}

Goals record

Disciplinary Record

Transfers

Transfers in

Transfers out

Loans in

Loans out

References

Bolton Wanderers F.C. seasons
Bolton Wanderers